Canal 5 is a Mexican free-to-air television network owned by TelevisaUnivision. It traces its origins to the foundation of Channel 5 in Mexico City in 1952 (also known by its identification code XHGC-TDT). Canal 5's program lineup is generally targeted at a younger audience and includes cartoons, foreign series and movies, along with a limited number of sporting events such as NFL games, boxing, the FIFA World Cup and, historically, the Olympic Games.

Canal 5 is mainly aimed at children and youth audiences, although in late hours it usually includes a more general concept with television series and reality shows. Over the decades among its programming, it includes many series purchased from networks such as Nickelodeon and Cartoon Network, among others; while the series aimed at the general public often come from Paramount Network, Fox Broadcasting Company, Warner Bros., ViacomCBS (now Paramount Global), MTV, NBCUniversal among others. The channel also broadcasts series produced by the company TelevisaUnivision, which owns the channel. In programming, its main national competitor in open television has historically been Azteca 7 of TV Azteca.

History

On May 10, 1952, XHGC-TV came to air for the first time. It was Mexico City's third television station, owned by Guillermo González Camarena, an inventor who created the first color television system. In 1955, XHGC was one of three stations that formed Telesistema Mexicano. González Camarena remained the general manager of XHGC until his death in 1965.

In 1963, XHGC became the first station in Mexico to broadcast in color. By request of Guillermo González Camarena, XHGC began targeting an audience of children and youth, with the first color telecast being Paraíso infantil (Children's Paradise). Over the years, Canal 5 has retained this programming focus, with a schedule incorporating foreign series and sports programs.

At the end of the 1980s, the then-vice president of Televisa, Alejandro Burillo Azcárraga, spearheaded drastic changes in the branding of the company's television networks. XHGC had branded as Canal 5 for years, using various logos with the number 5. However, as the network's various repeaters were not all on channel 5, the network began branding by the XHGC callsign. The landmark Energía Visual (Visual Energy) campaign, designed by Agustín Corona and Pablo Jato, featured idents with wildly varied logos and designs—a first for Mexican television. The campaign was designed to back the channel's youthful image.

In the 1990s, Canal 5 began branding with its channel number again. During this time period, Alejandro González Iñárritu, who had also been involved with Televisa's radio station XEW-FM (WFM), was involved in the creation of some of the network's promotional campaigns. Additionally, in 1994, Televisa obtained a concession for 62 additional television transmitters nationwide, most of which form a key link in the Canal 5 network today.

1999 saw the beginning of a shift in content providers for Canal 5, which had long been the exclusive Mexican rightsholder to Disney programs such as Chip 'n Dale Rescue Rangers, DuckTales and a Mexican version of Disney Club. In 1999, these rights began to migrate to Televisión Azteca and Azteca 7. Instead, the network began relying more on Warner Bros., Cartoon Network, PBS Kids, Fox and Nickelodeon programs.

Today, Canal 5 carries children's programs, films and international series, as well as sporting events including UEFA Champions League, UEFA Europa League and FIFA World Cup matches, a limited number of Liga MX fixtures and international matches involving the Mexico national team, and select NFL and NHL games. Canal 5 also features some of Televisa's own productions, such as El Chavo Animado and Mujeres Asesinas 3 by Pedro Torres.

In recent years, Canal 5's Twitter page started posting strange and disturbing posts typically between 3-7 am, only to be deleted after said date. Since then, the posts have been investigated and widely shared and talked about in the Mexican media. Infobae México, a Mexican news site, contacted one of the collaborators of Channel 5. However, they claimed they had no knowledge about the disturbing posts.

English infomercials
It is quite possible that the first modern infomercial series to run in North America was on San Diego-area television station XETV, which during the 1970s ran a one-hour program every Sunday consisting of advertisements for local homes for sale. As the station was actually licensed by the Mexican government to the city of Tijuana, but broadcast all of its programs in English for the U.S. market until 2017 (when it became a pure Spanish-language outlet for Canal 5), the FCC limit at that time of a maximum of 18 minutes of commercials in an hour did not apply to the station.

Transmitters
Canal 5 is carried on 66 of its own transmitters plus another 32 transmitters shared with Las Estrellas and one transmitter that carries a Televisa local service, Las Estrellas and Canal 5; these 31 transmitters do not carry Canal 5 in HD. It holds the rights to virtual channel 5 nationwide and broadcasts on it in almost all areas, with a handful of notable exceptions along the US-Mexico border.

In 2018, the concessions of all primary Canal 5 repeaters wholly owned by Televisa were consolidated in the concessionaire Radio Televisión, S.A. de C.V. as part of a reorganization of Televisa's concessionaires.

|-

|-

|-

|-

|-

|-

|-

|-

|-

|-

|-

|-

|-

|-

|-

|-

|-

|-

|-

|-

|-

|-

|-

|-

|-

|-

|-

|-

|-

|-

|-

|-

|-

|-

|-

|-

|-

|-

|-

|-

|-

|-

|-

|-

|-

|-

|-

|-

|-

|-

|-

|-

|-

|-

|-

|-

|-

|-

|-

|-

|-

|-

|-

|-

|-

|-

|-

|-

|-

Logos

Notes

References

External links
Official website

 
Children's television networks
Mass media in Mexico City
Television networks in Mexico
Televisa broadcast television networks
Television channels and stations established in 1952
1951 establishments in Mexico